The 1972 Jakarta Anniversary Tournament was an invitational association football tournament held from June 5 to 20 in Jakarta, Indonesia.  Ten teams participated in that edition.

Group stage

Group A

Group B

Knockout stage

Semi-finals

Third place play-off

Final

References 
Cruickshank, Mark; Garin, Erik; Herfiyana, Novan; Morrison, Neil; Veroeveren, Piet. "Jakarta Anniversary Tournament 1972". RSSSF.com

1972
1972 in Indonesian sport
1972 in Asian football